Chakib Nazim Hocine (born 8 August 1991) is an Algerian footballer who plays as a centre-back.

Early life
Hocine was born in Algeria and moved to Canada with his parents as a baby.

Playing career

Brossard
Hocine made his senior debut in 2012 with FC Brossard in the inaugural season of the Première Ligue de soccer du Québec, making 17 league appearances over the course of the season.

Mont-Royal Outremont
In 2013, Hocine signed with expansion side Mont-Royal Outremont, making 17 league appearances and scoring 3 goals.

Montreal Impact
Hocine spent the 2014 season in the Premier Development League (PDL) with Montreal Impact U23.

FC Montreal
In March 2015, Hocine made his USL debut as a starter in FC Montreal's inaugural match, a 2-0 loss to Toronto FC II.

Return to Mont-Royal
After being released by FC Montreal, Hocine returned to the PLSQ, signing with his former club Mont-Royal Outremont, making 9 league appearances and scoring one goal.

Lanaudière
In 2017, Hocine signed with Lanaudière, but only made one league appearance for the club.

Mississippi Brilla
Hocine played the 2017 PDL season with Mississippi Brilla, helping the club reach the National semi-finals.

Ekenäs
In January 2018, Hocine signed abroad for the first time with Finnish Ykkönen club Ekenäs IF.

HFX Wanderers
On 16 January 2019, it was announced that Hocine had signed with the HFX Wanderers ahead of the inaugural Canadian Premier League season. He made his debut for the Wanderers on May 16 in a Canadian Championship match against Vaughan Azzurri. On 14 December 2019, the club announced that Hocine would not be returning for the 2020 season.

Valour FC
Hocine joined fellow Canadian Premier League club Valour FC on July 20, 2020. On January 15, 2021, Valour announced that Hocine would not return for the 2021 season.

Third spell at Mont-Royal
In July 2021, Hocine rejoined Mont-Royal Outremont.

References

External links
 

1991 births
Living people
Association football defenders
Algerian footballers
Canadian soccer players
Footballers from Algiers
Soccer players from Montreal
Algerian emigrants to Canada
Naturalized citizens of Canada
Algerian expatriate footballers
Canadian expatriate soccer players
Expatriate soccer players in the United States
Algerian expatriate sportspeople in the United States
Canadian expatriate sportspeople in the United States
Expatriate footballers in Finland
Algerian expatriate sportspeople in Finland
Canadian expatriate sportspeople in Finland
Montreal Impact U23 players
FC Montreal players
Mississippi Brilla players
Ekenäs IF players
HFX Wanderers FC players
Valour FC players
Première ligue de soccer du Québec players
USL League Two players
USL Championship players
Ykkönen players
Canadian Premier League players
FC Brossard players
FC St-Léonard players
FC Lanaudière players
CS Mont-Royal Outremont players
A.S. Blainville players